Greg Briggs (born October 19, 1968) is a former American football safety in the National Football League (NFL) for the Dallas Cowboys, Cleveland Browns, Chicago Bears and Minnesota Vikings. He was also a member of the Frankfurt Galaxy in Frankfurt Galaxy the World League of American Football (WLAF). He first enrolled at Copiah-Lincoln Community College before transferring to the University of Arkansas at Pine Bluff and Texas Southern University.

Early years
Briggs attended Franklin High School in Meadville, Mississippi, where he focused on playing basketball. As a senior, he received All-district honors. He also practiced track.

He accepted a basketball scholarship from the Copiah-Lincoln Community College. He decided to try out for the football team in his third year there. In 1989, he started all of the games at free safety, compiling 6 interceptions, while receiving All-JUCO and All-state honors.

In 1990, he accepted a basketball scholarship from the University of Arkansas at Pine Bluff. The football coaching staff convinced him into changing sports. He played in the first two contests before being declared ineligible because of a class conflict. At the end of the season, the football program was suspended for 1991 by the NAIA, paving the way for Briggs and six of his teammates to walk-on at Texas Southern University, where the coach said he'd have to sleep on the floor because he didn't have an extra dorm room available.

As a senior, he began playing mostly in the nickel defense and on special teams. He became a starter at outside linebacker after the fourth game of the season, when a starter went down with an injury. He also combined the responsibilities of a safety and received All-SWAC honors. He recorded 42 tackles, 3 passes defensed, 2 sacks, one fumble recovery, one interception and one blocked kick. He was a teammate of future hall of fame player Michael Strahan.

Professional career

Dallas Cowboys
Briggs was selected by the Dallas Cowboys in the fifth round (120th) of the 1992 NFL Draft, after impressing in the NFL Combine. He was tried at safety, before focusing on playing linebacker. On August 25, he was placed on the physically unable to perform list with a right hip injury. The team would go on to win Super Bowl XXVII. In 1993, he was switched to tight end, before being waived on August 24.

Cleveland Browns
On December 15, 1993, he was signed to the Cleveland Browns practice squad. He was waived on July 21, 1994.

Frankfurt Galaxy
After being out of football for a year, he played for the Frankfurt Galaxy of the World League of American Football in 1995, where he led his team in tackles and contributed to win World Bowl '95.

Hamilton Tiger-Cats
On July 20, 1995, he signed with the Hamilton Tiger-Cats of the Canadian Football League. He was released before the start of the season.

Dallas Cowboys
Briggs was signed as a free agent by the Dallas Cowboys in 1995. He was released on August 27. He was re-signed on September 21. He played in 11 games, registering 9 special teams tackles and was a part of the Super Bowl XXX winning team. He wasn't re-signed after the season.

Chicago Bears
On June 6, 1996, he was signed by the Chicago Bears to play linebacker and special teams, reuniting with head coach and former Cowboys defensive coordinator Dave Wannstedt. He was waived on October 1. He was later re-signed on October 15.

Minnesota Vikings
In April 1997, he signed with the Minnesota Vikings, as a linebacker that was focused on playing special teams. He was cut on August 24, 1998.

Personal life
After retiring from professional football, he traveled with Reggie White and spoke at churches. His nephew Diyral Briggs also played in the National Football League.

References

External links
Professional Football Stats

Living people
1968 births
People from Meadville, Mississippi
Players of American football from Mississippi
American football safeties
Canadian football defensive backs
African-American players of American football
African-American players of Canadian football
Junior college men's basketball players in the United States
Copiah-Lincoln Wolfpack football players
Arkansas–Pine Bluff Golden Lions football players
Texas Southern Tigers football players
Dallas Cowboys players
Cleveland Browns players
Frankfurt Galaxy players
Hamilton Tiger-Cats players
Chicago Bears players
American expatriate players of American football
Minnesota Vikings players
American men's basketball players
21st-century African-American people
20th-century African-American sportspeople